James Johnson may refer to:

Artists, actors, authors, and musicians
James Austin Johnson (born 1989), American comedian & actor, Saturday Night Live cast member
James B. Johnson (born 1944), author of science nonfiction novels
James P. Johnson (1894–1955), New Jersey jazz musician, known for his "stride" piano playing
James Weldon Johnson (1871–1938), African-American figure in the Harlem Renaissance
James Johnson (author and priest) (1674–1740), English author and cleric
James Johnson (engraver) (1753–1811), Scottish publisher
James Johnson (artist) (1803–1834), English artist
James "Stump" Johnson (1902–1969), St. Louis blues musician
Jamey Johnson (born 1975), country musician
J. C. Johnson (1896–1981), songwriter and jazz pianist sometimes erroneously known as James C. Johnson, best known for his collaborations with Fats Waller
James F. Johnson (1926–2000), American blues musician
Super Chikan (James Johnson, born 1951), American blues musician
Rick James (James Ambrose Johnson Jr., 1948–2004), American singer
Raymond St. Jacques (James Arthur Johnson, 1930–1990), actor
 James Johnson (carving artist)

Military figures
James Allen Johnson (1924–2016), major general in U.S. Army Corps of Engineers
James Bulmer Johnson (1889–1943), recipient of the Victoria Cross during World War I
James E. Johnson (1926–1950), Korean War Medal of Honor recipient
James H. Johnson Jr. (born 1937), lieutenant general in the U.S. Army
James H. Johnson (major general) (born 1929), major general in the U.S. Army
James K. Johnson (1916–1997), Korean War flying ace
James Johnson (South African Navy officer) (1918–1990), Chief of the South African Navy
Johnnie Johnson (RAF officer) (James E. Johnson, 1915–2001), WWII RAF fighter ace

Political figures
James Johnson (Virginia congressman) (died 1825), U.S. congressman from Virginia
James Johnson (Kentucky politician) (1774–1826), U.S. congressman from Kentucky
James Johnson (Georgia politician) (1811–1891), U.S. congressman and governor of Georgia
 James Johnson (Iowa politician) (born 1939), state representative of Iowa
James Johnson (British politician) (1908–1995), British Labour MP for Rugby, 1950–1959, and Hull West, 1964–1983
James A. Johnson (California politician) (1829–1896), U.S. congressman and lieutenant governor from California
James A. Johnson (businessman) (1943–2020), businessman, Democratic lobbyist, and chairman of Fannie Mae, the Kennedy Center and the Brookings Institution
James A. C. Johnson (1867–1937), mayor of Englewood, New Jersey
James Coody Johnson (1864–1927), African-Creek entrepreneur, interpreter, lawyer and politician
James D. Johnson (1924–2010), Arkansas politician
James E. Johnson (United States Navy) (born 1926), U.S. Assistant Secretary of the Navy
James F. P. Johnson, member of the Florida House of Representatives
James G. Johnson (1855–1936), mayor of Springfield and justice on the Ohio Supreme Court
James Hutchins Johnson (1802–1887), U.S. congressman from New Hampshire
James Leeper Johnson (1818–1877), U.S. congressman from Kentucky
James M. Johnson (judge), justice of the Washington Supreme Court
James M. Johnson (politician) (1832–1913), lieutenant governor of Arkansas
James Paul Johnson (born 1930), U.S. congressman from Colorado
James Johnson (Manitoba politician) (1855–1929), politician in Manitoba, Canada
James Johnson (Delaware politician) or "J.J." (born 1943), member of the Delaware House of Representatives
Mike Johnson (Louisiana politician) (James Michael Johnson, born 1972), member of the Louisiana House of Representatives

Sportspeople

American football
James Johnson (running back) (born 1984), former running back for the Minnesota Vikings
James Johnson (Canadian football) (born 1980), professional American football and Canadian football cornerback
James-Michael Johnson (born 1989), American football player
Jim Johnson (coach) (James Archie Johnson Jr., 1912–2004), American football, basketball, and baseball player, coach, and college athletics administrator
J. J. Johnson (American football) (James E. Johnson Jr., born 1974), former running back for the Miami Dolphins, 1998 winner of the Conerly Trophy

Baseball
Jim Johnson (baseball, born 1945) (James Brian Johnson, 1945–1987), American baseball pitcher (1967–1970) and briefly a member of 1970 San Francisco Giants
Jim Johnson (baseball, born 1983) (James Robert Johnson), pitcher for the Atlanta Braves
Lefty Johnson (pitcher) (James W. Johnson), American baseball player of the 1930s

Other sports
James Johnson (sprinter), American track and field sprinter of the 1960s
James Johnson (wrestler) (born 1954), American Olympic wrestler
James Johnson (basketball, born 1971), former head coach of the Virginia Tech Hokies men's basketball team
James Johnson (basketball, born 1987), basketball player for the Brooklyn Nets
James Johnson (cricketer) (born 1998), English cricketer
James Johnson (sports administrator), Australian sports administrator and businessman
James H. Johnson (figure skater) (1874–1921), British silver medalist in pairs figure skating at the 1908 Summer Olympics
Jim Johnson (footballer, born 1923) (James Johnson, 1923–1987), English footballer for Grimsby Town and Carlisle United
Jim Johnson (ice hockey, born 1962) (James Erik Johnson), former ice hockey player in the National Hockey League
Jim Johnson (rugby league) (James Joseph Johnson, 1881–1956), New Zealand international rugby league player
Jim Johnson (athletic director) (James R. Johnson), current athletics director in the NCAA Division II
Jim Johnson (ice hockey, born 1942) (Norman James Johnson, 1942–2021), ice hockey player in the National Hockey League and World Hockey Association

Others
James Johnson (Master of Sidney Sussex College, Cambridge) (1640–1704), Master of Sidney Sussex 1688–1704
James Johnson (surgeon) (1777–1845), British surgeon, writer and editor
James Johnson (assistant bishop of Western Equatorial Africa) (1836–1917), Sierra Leone Creole Anglican bishop
James Johnson (bishop of Worcester) (1705–1774), English prelate, Bishop of Gloucester (1752–59) and Worcester (1759–74)
James Johnson (bishop of St Helena) (1926-2022), English prelate, Bishop of St Helena (1985–91)
James Johnson (railway engineer), Locomotive Superintendent of the Great North of Scotland Railway, 1890–1894
James A. Johnson (architect) (1865–1939), American architect
James Hervey Johnson (1901–1988), American atheist
James Wood Johnson (1856–1932), co-founder of the company Johnson and Johnson
James Yate Johnson (1820–1900), English naturalist
President James Johnson (Metal Gear), the fictional 44th President of the United States in Metal Gear Solid 2: Sons of Liberty
James Johnson, sole survivor of the wreck of the Dunbar

See also
Jimmy Johnson (disambiguation)
James Johnston (disambiguation)
Jamie Johnson (disambiguation)
James Johnstone (disambiguation)